Doll (English, German: dweller at a division of land or boundary mark; descendant of Doll, a pet form of names beginning with Dult (patience), as Dultwic and Duldfrid) is a surname. Notable people with the surname include:
Andrea Doll (born 1940), American politician
Anton Eduard Doll (1826–1887), German painter
Birgit Doll (1958–2015), Austrian actress and theatre director
Bob Doll (1919–1959), American basketball player
Charles Fitzroy Doll (1850–1929), British architect
Dotty Doll (born 1936), American politician
Henri George Doll (1902–1991), French scientist
Henry W. Doll (born 1870), New York politician
Mordaunt Doll (1888–1966), English cricketer
Richard Doll (1912–2005), English biostatistician
Steve Doll (1960–2009), American professional wrestler
Thomas Doll (born 1966), German footballer and coach

German-language surnames
Surnames of German origin
German toponymic surnames